Trogloctenus is a genus of wandering spiders first described by R. de Lessert in 1935.  it contains only two species: T. briali and T. fagei. Originally placed as a subgenus of Ctenus, it was raised to genus status in 1967.

References

Araneomorphae genera
Ctenidae
Spiders of Africa